Chlorox, Ammonia and Coffee is a 2004 Norwegian comedy film written and directed by Mona J. Hoel, starring Benedikte Lindbeck, Kjersti Holmen and Fares Fares. The film follows multiple storylines, and is about having the courage to take chances in life.

External links
 
 
 
 Chlorox, Ammonium and Coffee! at the Norwegian Film Institute

2004 films
2004 comedy films
Norwegian comedy films